James Andrews may refer to:

 James Andrews (botanical artist) (1801–1876), English botanical artist
 James J. Andrews (1829–1862), American Civil War spy
 James J. Andrews (mathematician) (1930–1998), American mathematician
 Sir James Andrews, 1st Baronet (1877–1951), member of Privy Council of Northern Ireland
 James Andrews (physician) (born 1942), American surgeon, renowned practitioner of sports medicine
James Pettit Andrews (1737–1797), English historian and antiquary
Jamie Andrews, fictional character from the drama series, Instant Star
Jim Andrews (1865–1907), American baseball player
 Jim Andrews, owner of Andrews McMeel Universal
James Andrews (musician) (born 1969), American musician

See also
James Andrews Grant (born 1937), Canadian lawyer
James Andrew (disambiguation)